Maafilaafushi (Dhivehi: މާފިލާފުށި) is one of the inhabited islands of Lhaviyani Atoll in the Maldives.

The island of Maafilaafushi was resettled in the 1980s in order to relieve the lack of land availability in Malé. The island once served as the capital of the separatist Kingdom of Boduthiladhunmathi. Mohamed Rannabadeyri Thakuru with the help of Adhi Raja of Cannanore attacked Male' and tried to overthrow the kingdom of Ibrahim Kalaafaanu (Sultan Ibrahim III 1585–1609). However being unable to take control of the capital Male' they fled to Faadhippolhu where Mohamed Rannabadeyri controlled the northern atolls of the Maldives until he was overthrown by Sultan Muhammad Imaduddin I (1620-1648).

Islands of the Maldives